Below is a list of diplomatic representatives from Egypt to the United Kingdom.

See also
Egypt – United Kingdom relations
List of diplomats from the United Kingdom to Egypt

References

 
United Kingdom
Egypt